Carstens Publications, Inc. was a publisher of books and magazines related to the railroad and airplane hobby fields until its permanent closure on August 22, 2014. Many of the titles published by Carstens were older than the company, and have long established histories in their respective markets. Carstens was the chief competitor to Kalmbach Publishing in the scale model hobby and enthusiast field. What made Carstens stand out from the competition was the in-depth detail and active voice of the books and magazines. The company's list of monthly magazine titles included:

 Railroad Model Craftsman
 Railfan & Railroad
 Flying Models

The company also published a line of annuals dedicated to modeling narrow gauge railways and railroad photography, which included:

 The On30 Annual
 The HOn3 Annual
 Great Railroad Photography

Carstens also published a number of books on the subject of railroad history and scale model railroading, as well as a few select titles related to the world of aviation and model airplanes.

Early years
The roots of the company go back to 1933 with the establishment of The Model Craftsman magazine in Chicago by Emanuele Stieri, and edited by Harold V. Loose. Charles A. Penn took over the company in 1934, and the publishing house established offices in New York City. In 1942, the company was moved across the Hudson River to suburban Ramsey, New Jersey. When it was started, the magazine focused on all kinds of home hobbycraft, but in 1948 the magazine was renamed Railroad Model Craftsman, focusing on the model railroading hobby exclusively. It is this distinction that prompted rival publication Model Railroader to proclaim "Model railroading exclusively since 1934."

Penn Publications postwar era
In 1952, Harold Carstens (known to his friends as "Hal") joined the staff as an associate editor. He had been a contributor to the magazine before coming on board as a full-time staff member. He moved up the editorial ranks and was named president of the company following the retirement of Charles Penn in 1962. In 1955 the company moved to larger quarters in an old telephone company building on Arch Street in Ramsey. A second move placed the company in the historic Ramsey Journal building right alongside the Erie Railroad main line and across the street from the Ramsey train station in July 1963. Hal Carstens purchased the company outright from Charles Penn later that year and renamed it Carstens Publications in 1969.

Expansion to present day
In 1969, Flying Models magazine was acquired by the company, adding coverage of the model airplane hobby. In 1973, the company relocated to its current headquarters in rural Newton, New Jersey. The new Railfan magazine was established in-house in 1974, dedicated to the railroad enthusiast and the hobby of railfanning. In 1979, Carstens purchased the old Railroad magazine, which started publication in 1906, and combined it to form Railfan & Railroad magazine.

In 2006, Carstens Publications launched the successful On30 Annual, a special publication dedicated to the modeling of narrow gauge railways in O scale. This was followed up in 2009 with the establishment of the HOn3 Annual, which focuses on HO scale narrow gauge modeling. Both annuals are edited by Chris Lane. In 2010, the editors of Railfan & Railroad launched a special edition titled Great Railroad Photography, which was a showcase for innovative and creative photography both contemporary and vintage.

Henry Carstens was the company's last president and publisher, having taken over after his father Hal Carstens' untimely death in June 2009. He was assisted by his mother, Phyllis Carstens.

Permanent closure

After years of financial struggle, Carstens Publications president Henry Carstens announced the company's permanent closure on August 22, 2014. On September 1, 2014, White River Productions announced its acquisition of Railfan & Railroad as well as sister publication Railroad Model Craftsman, as well as the entire line of Carstens books. White River Productions has announced its intention to continue the publication of RMC and Railfan & Railroad, as well as develop new book titles in the future. White River Productions also purchased the rights to produce the On30 Annual and HOn3 Annual.

There has been no announcement made by Carstens regarding the future of Flying Models.

Notes

External links

Magazine publishing companies of the United States
Book publishing companies based in New Jersey
Publishing companies established in 1933
Companies based in Sussex County, New Jersey
Rail transport publishing companies
American companies established in 1933